Miss USA 1984 was the 33rd Miss USA pageant, televised live from Lakeland Civic Auditorium, Lakeland, Florida on May 17, 1984.  At the conclusion of the final competition, Mai Shanley of New Mexico was crowned Miss USA 1984 by outgoing titleholder Julie Hayek of California.

The pageant was hosted by Bob Barker.  It was the first time the pageant had been held in Florida since 1971, the last time the pageant had been held in its old home of Miami Beach.

In an odd occurrence, both women in the top two had previously competed at Miss America, neither one of whom placed at that pageant.

Results

Placements

Final Competition

Historical significance 
 New Mexico wins competition for the first time and surpasses its previous highest placement in 1965. Also becoming in the 22nd state who does it for the first time.
 West Virginia earns the 1st runner-up position for the second time and it reaches again its highest placement ever at the contest. The last time it placed this was in 1957.
 Tennessee earns the 2nd runner-up position for the second time. The last time it placed this was in 1962.
 Missouri earns the 3rd runner-up position for the second time. The last time it placed this was in 1971.
 District of Columbia earns the 4th runner-up position for the second time. The last time it placed this was in 1965.
 States that placed in semifinals the previous year were Oklahoma and Texas.
 Texas placed for the tenth consecutive year.
 Oklahoma made its second consecutive placement.
 Tennessee last placed in 1982.
 New Mexico last placed in 1980.
 Illinois and North Carolina last placed in 1979.
 District of Columbia last placed in 1977.
 Missouri and Oregon last placed in 1976.
 West Virginia last placed in 1961.
 Michigan breaks an ongoing streak of placements since 1982.

Delegates
The Miss USA 1984 delegates were:

 Alabama - Kelly Flowers
 Alaska - Sherri McNeally
 Arizona - Daria Sparling
 Arkansas - Shelly Boyd
 California - Theresa Ring
 Colorado - Michelle Anderson
 Connecticut - Lynne Scalo
 Delaware - Denise Lennick
 District of Columbia - Steffanee Leaming
 Florida - Stacy Hassfurder
 Georgia - Jayne Poteet
 Hawaii - Puna Stillman
 Idaho - Valencia Bilyeu
 Illinois - LaVonne Misselle
 Indiana - Susan Willarbo
 Iowa - Michele Boisvert
 Kansas - Elizabeth Johnson
 Kentucky - Tammy Melendez
 Louisiana - Rusanne Jourdan
 Maine - Vickie Lynn Gay
 Maryland - Betsy Cook
 Massachusetts - Deborah Neary
 Michigan - Adriana Krambeck
 Minnesota - Martha Mork
 Mississippi - Carla Green
 Missouri - Sandra Percival 
 Montana - Kristi Ogren
 Nebraska - Joni Rundall    
 Nevada - Donna Lee McNeil
 New Hampshire - Diane Gadoury
 New Jersey - Diane Everett Qualter
 New Mexico - Mai Shanley
 New York - Carolina Flury
 North Carolina - Cookie Noak
 North Dakota - Suzanne Lewis
 Ohio - Rosi Erwin
 Oklahoma - Julia Murdock
 Oregon - Debbie Epperson
 Pennsylvania - Tina Albright
 Rhode Island - Debbie Mowry
 South Carolina - Ginger Gree
 South Dakota - Donna Smith
 Tennessee - Desiree Daniels
 Texas - Laura Shaw
 Utah - Michele Lynn Brown
 Vermont - Sue O'Brien
 Virginia - Leah Rush
 Washington - Sue Gerrish
 West Virginia -  Kelly Lea Anderson
 Wisconsin - Tamara Su Schoff
 Wyoming - Cheryl Rawson

Special entries
Miss Teen USA 1983 - Ruth Zakarian
Miss Teen USA 1984 - Cherise Haugen

Contestant notes
Kelly Anderson (West Virginia), the first runner-up, went on to compete in Miss World 1984, where she placed fifth overall.
Additionally, Sandy Percival (Missouri), the third runner-up, competed at Miss International 1984, where she placed in the Top 15.
Three contestants previously competed in the Miss America pageant:
Mai Shanley (New Mexico) - Miss New Mexico 1983
Desiree Daniels (Tennessee) - Miss Tennessee 1982 (first runner-up at Miss America 1983)
Kelly Anderson (West Virginia) - Miss West Virginia 1982

Judges
Jim Craig
Anna Colon
Ralph Wolfe Cowan
Anne Kirstin Clenshaw
Billy Hufsey
Kim Seelbrede, Miss USA 1981 from Ohio
Tony Dorsett
David Mason Daniels
Catherine Hickland
Irving Mansfield
Vicki Lawrence

External links
Official website

1984
May 1984 events in the United States
1984 beauty pageants
1984 in Florida
Lakeland, Florida
1984